Shelgaon (Wangi) is a village in the Karmala taluka of Solapur district in Maharashtra state, India.

Demographics
Covering  and comprising 858 households at the time of the 2011 census of India, Shelgaon (Wangi) had a population of 4021. There were 2090 males and 1931 females, with 493 people being aged six or younger.

References

Villages in Karmala taluka